Agustín Emiliano Sufi (born 26 January 1995) is an Argentine professional footballer who plays as a left winger for Central Norte.

Career
Sufi's career began in Gimnasia y Esgrima's system. He was loaned to Torneo Argentino B's Monterrico in 2013–14, subsequently appearing ten times before returning to his parent club. After eleven appearances for Gimnasia y Esgrima across the 2014 and 2015 campaigns, which included his professional bow against San Martín in August 2014, Sufi netted his opening senior goals on 6 March 2016 as he scored a brace in a 4–3 win over Boca Unidos. He scored four goals across seventeen appearances in the 2016 Primera B Nacional season. Sufi spent 2019–20 with Patronato, but wouldn't appear at first-team level.

Sufi returned to Primera B Nacional in August 2020, agreeing terms with Santamarina. After spending the 2021 season at Fénix de Pilar, Sufi moved to Central Norte in February 2022.

Career statistics
.

References

External links

1995 births
Living people
Sportspeople from Jujuy Province
Argentine footballers
Association football wingers
Primera Nacional players
Torneo Argentino B players
Gimnasia y Esgrima de Jujuy footballers
Club Atlético Patronato footballers
Club y Biblioteca Ramón Santamarina footballers
Club Atlético Fénix players
Central Norte players